David North (Christoph Nord) is a character appearing in American comic books published by Marvel Comics. He was originally known as Maverick, and more recently as Agent Zero. The character first appeared in X-Men #5 and was created by writer John Byrne and co-writer/artist Jim Lee.

Daniel Henney portrayed Agent Zero in the 2009 superhero film X-Men Origins: Wolverine.

Publication history
David North first appeared as Maverick in X-Men #5 (Feb. 1992).

David North has appeared in a self-titled one-shot Maverick: In the Shadow of Death as well as a self-titled short-lived ongoing series called Maverick.

Later, as Agent Zero, he became a regular in the second series of Weapon X.

Fictional character biography

Early life
Christoph Nord was born in East Germany to American parents. His early history is clouded in mystery, though there are whispers that his parents were involved with the Nazi regime. He also had an older brother, Andreas. A mutant, Christoph possessed the ability to absorb kinetic energy through impact with little to no harm.

Cell Six
A self-described idealist, he fought against the communist regime during the height of the Cold War, joining a West German black ops unit named Cell Six. On a mission in Italy, he was injured by a rival assassin codenamed the Confessor.

While recovering, he met an Italian nurse, Ginetta Barsalini, whom he fell in love with and married. Over the next three years, Cell Six's field agents were eliminated one by one, except for Nord. Nord realized Ginetta was a spy. Threatening to shoot her, he demanded to know her employer. Saying he didn't have the guts to shoot a defenseless woman in cold blood, she lunged at him with a knife, causing him to shoot her in self-defense. Dying, she revealed that in killing her, he also killed their unborn child. Long after this incident, Nord continues to be wracked with guilt about the betrayal and still seeks answers as to whom Barsalini was working for. This watershed moment left Nord cold and distrusting of everyone, especially women.

Weapon X
Fueled by the betrayal, Nord became one of the most efficient covert operatives in Germany. In the 1960s, his exploits caught the attention of the CIA, who offered him a spot in the clandestine Team X. He agreed, and at this time, changed his name to David North. As a part of Team X, he was one of the several mutant operatives the government experimented on and exploited. Each member unknowingly received false memory implants, and North received a slight healing factor culled from Logan's DNA. North's immediate team consisted of three field agents: North, Logan (who later became Wolverine), and Victor Creed (who later became Sabretooth). The mutant teleporter John Wraith also referred to as Kestrel, served as the team's intelligence man and extractor. It was at this time that North began wearing his signature yellow and black faceplate.

On a mission in East Germany, both Creed and Logan were badly injured. Rather than follow protocol and leave them, North dragged them to the extraction point. Cornered by Andreas Nord, now an assassin, North saved his teammates the only way he could; killing his only brother. Because of this incident, Logan holds North in very high regard.

Another mission saw the three agents confront Omega Red in Berlin. They succeeded in stealing the carbonadium synthesizer, which was necessary for the Russian to control his death factor pheromone. Taking down the psychopathic Omega Red was not as easy. In the chaos, Creed panicked, killing Janice Hollenback, the CIA mole they were attempting to rescue. The team then escaped by jumping from a ten-story window. The synthesizer was thought lost, and a rift formed between Creed and Logan due to Creed's actions on the mission. Unbeknownst to the agency, Logan had recovered the synthesizer and hid it. North suspected as much at the time but did not know for sure.

By the early 1970s, Team X was summarily disbanded. However, the team's agents were captured by Weapon X to be used as test subjects. When Logan underwent the adamantium bonding, he went on a murderous rampage, allowing North and the others to escape. Around this time, North inexplicably lost his powers. Undaunted, North continued to work in espionage as a mercenary using the trade name Maverick. The inspiration for the name had come from a conversation in which North boasted that he neither trusted nor needed anyone, to which Logan responded, "A regular maverick, eh?"

Mercenary
Time passed and Maverick developed a reputation as one of the best-hired guns available. Maverick compensated for his lack of powers with meticulous planning and a reliance on the latest technology.

He worked for private parties and governmental agencies alike, taking several contracts from retired Major Arthur Barrington, the man who had brought North into the CIA. When Omega Red captured Wolverine as well as several of the X-Men in Berlin in an effort to locate the carbonadium synthesizer, Maverick was sent in by Barrington. Maverick helped free the captive X-Men and tracked Sabretooth to Omega Red. With the X-Men's help, he obtained the device from Wolverine and hid it once again. Maverick aided the X-Men in combat against Sabretooth, Omega Red, Fenris, and Matsu'o Tsurayaba. During the course of this incident, Maverick apparently murders Dr. Abraham Cornelius in cold blood.

Barrington later sent him to acquire the Xavier Files, profiles of the powers and weaknesses of various mutants, which were compiled by the X-Men's founder. Maverick battled Warhawk and killed Dr. Alexander Ryking. In the clash, Warhawk exploded, seemingly destroying the files. Maverick was later hired by the US government to protect Aldo Ferro, a former Weapon X member. Former Team X alumni sought Ferro out after Mastodon died when his age suppression factor reversed. Unbeknownst to Team X, Ferro was the second Psi-Borg and was responsible for the planting of false memories during their time with Weapon X. Betrayed by Ferro, Maverick then sided with his former teammates Wolverine, Sabretooth, Silver Fox, and John Wraith, and Ferro was seemingly killed in the subsequent battle.

Maverick next sought to kill Sabretooth, who was in the midst of a psychotic murderous rampage following the death of Birdy. First seeking Wolverine to aid him in this goal, he reluctantly aids the X-Men in merely capturing Sabretooth, setting in motion what became a failed attempt by Charles Xavier to rehabilitate the serial killer.

Legacy Virus
Maverick swiftly contracted the Legacy Virus. This development brought about the random return of his powers but also a loss of energy and horrible scarring all over his body. He tried to convince Wolverine to kill him, but Wolverine refused. Maverick decided to make the best of it, and "fight the good fight." His health declining, he travelled the world from safe house to safe house, using his savings to procure treatment for his infection.

During this time, he recruited a very unstable Wolverine to help him rescue Deadpool. Maverick was attacked by a group led by Slayback at his Manhattan safe house. Maverick managed to escape to the X-Mansion and spent several hours in a coma. After coming to, Maverick revealed that he and Deadpool had been targeted because both were mutants with healing factors taken from Wolverine's DNA template. Maverick felt they would soon come for Wolverine directly. Deadpool was being experimented on in an attempt to create a cure for the Legacy Virus. Maverick and Wolverine located and rescued Deadpool. It was later discovered by Beast that Deadpool's body could not generate a cure.

While in New York, he saved a fellow Legacy Virus-positive mutant, teenager Chris Bradley and his family from an attack by the Friends of Humanity. The FOH retaliated by firebombing Bradley's home, spurring Maverick to use his connections to relocate the Bradley family to Florida under aliases. He also got Chris medical treatment and set his parents up with new jobs.

He then left for Canada. While there, former KGB agent and mutant telepath Elena Ivanova found him, demanding he helps her track down Sabretooth, who had killed her mother during his Weapon X years. Before he could answer her, they were attacked by Omega Red, who had tracked Ivanova to Maverick in hopes of recovering the carbonadium synthesizer. With the help of John Wraith, they succeeded in keeping the device away from the villain.

Ivanova felt that she owed Maverick and stuck by his side, despite his icy demeanor. They travelled together for a time. The Legacy Virus then took hold, killing North. Ivanova used her powers to resuscitate him. To their surprise, the virus seemingly went into remission, all of his wounds from the virus were healed. His powers not only returned but were enhanced. Also, Weapon X's memory implants were cleared from his mind. He would later realize that the Legacy Virus made his new powers inconsistent, at times making them a danger to himself. Immediately, trouble found them in the form of Russian mob boss Ivan Pushkin, who sent his enforcers Hammer and Sickle to abduct them.

Pushkin used Ivanova's powers in an attempt to brainwash Maverick into killing Major Arthur Barrington by making him believe it was Barrington who had set up Barsalini's betrayal all those years ago. In reality, Barrington was to deliver testimony at an inquest that would have been damaging to Pushkin's business interests. Attacking but not killing Barrington, Maverick quickly regained his senses. While he blinded the left eye of Sickle with his own weapon, Hammer killed Barrington.

Meanwhile, Chris Bradley ran away from home, missing his girlfriend in New York. The FOH tapped his friends' phone and when he reached New York, they again tried to kill Chris. Maverick, Ivanova, and Wolverine saved him and his friend. Ivanova then used her abilities to make the FOH and Chris' girlfriend think he'd died in the scuffle. Both shaken by the life-threatening events of the past few days, Ivanova and North's relationship, platonic up to this point, became physical.

The following morning, Ivanova still expressed the desire to go after Sabretooth. Maverick harshly warned that an assault against Sabretooth was a fool's errand, and implied she'd slept with him to coerce him to aid her goal. Angered, Ivanova left Maverick that night to continue her vendetta. A regretful Maverick traced Ivanova's steps and found her as she was rendered comatose by Sabretooth's assault. Maverick stopped Sabretooth from delivering the killing blow and left a badly injured Ivanova in the care of the Bradley family.

Maverick then renewed his vendetta with Ivan Pushkin, desperate to avenge Barrington's death. Pushkin captured Maverick, hoping to coerce Maverick to work for him. Maverick, however, freed himself and ruined Pushkin's attempted theft of a payload of A.I.M. weaponry. In the midst of this, Sickle gained a measure of revenge by gouging out Maverick's left eye and stranding him in the Swiss Alps

Agent Zero
The Weapon X project was soon reinvigorated and having brought Sabretooth and Wraith back into the fold, they were sent to recruit Maverick. Wraith lured an unwitting Maverick into a rendezvous. Maverick refused to join, and a fierce battle ensued. Sabretooth caught Maverick off guard, impaling him in the chest then throwing him off the roof of a 20-story building and onto the street below.

Taken to Weapon X near death, Malcolm Colcord again offered him the chance to join, as he could still be saved. This time, he reluctantly agreed, rationalizing it by saying he couldn't "fight the good fight" as a corpse. He was healed and then upgraded with the explicit intent of assassinating Wolverine. He has no scent, makes no sound thanks to a vibranium suit, possesses an enhanced healing factor, and a corrosive was added to his concussive blasts that hinder a foes' healing factor. In addition, he was equipped with a wide array of weapons, from wrist-mounted plasma blasters to an adamantium-coated knife. The world believed that North was dead, and he sought to keep it that way. He dyed his brown hair black and adopted the new alias Agent Zero.  After sending him on a few simple missions, Colcord tried to break his will by sending him to kill Wolverine, a mission he purposely botched.

Feeling guilty for joining the enemy, he contemplated suicide daily. His hatred for his teammate Sabretooth still ran deep, as he tried yet again to kill him, only to be stopped from dealing a fatal blow by the Director.

During a mission, Agent Zero encountered a new Maverick, who unbeknownst to Zero, was Chris Bradley. Bradley had infiltrated a mutant terrorist group called Gene Nation in an effort to destroy them from inside. Bradley had wanted revenge on Weapon X for 'killing' North. To achieve that goal, he received training in black ops from Cable and assumed the Maverick mantle. Zero, believing this new Maverick was a terrorist, shot and killed him, only to find the truth as Bradley lay dying. Returning to the base after this occurred, Zero found Weapon X had disappeared without a trace. Zero then picked up Bradley's fight, attacking Gene Nation strongholds across the world and also searched for answers as to what happened to the program.

It was revealed that Zero doesn't know what happened to Weapon X was because he was being brainwashed by Mesmero as Zero had become increasingly harder to control. Zero had gone after Gene Nation because of Weapon X's instruction. Without realizing it, Zero served as executioner at Neverland, a mutant concentration camp set up by Weapon X. But as soon as Weapon X bothered to reveal these truths, they put him under again, and Zero went on, none the wiser.

Decimation
Agent Zero lost his powers on M-Day, as a result of Scarlet Witch's actions during the House of M. It has been revealed that he is among the mutants who have been depowered.

North is seen residing in a center for former mutants and once again using the Maverick alias. Wolverine sought him out for information on carbonadium, reuniting the two and Jubilee. However, Omega Red soon attacked the building, looking for the carbonadium synthesizer.

Maverick stole Weapon X files and sold them on the black market. In an effort to cover up his involvement in Kick-starting the Strikeforce X program from Wolverine, he killed the man to whom he sold the files.

Still going by the program name, Agent Zero, Nord went back to mercenary work and was petitioned by an unknown intelligence agency to take down Doctor Doom after the Latverian overlord was framed for a terrorist attack by a rogue splinter cell flying his banner.

Powers and abilities
North's primary mutant power is an ability to absorb the kinetic energy generated by an impact without harm to himself. While there are limits to this power, North can survive falls from tremendous heights, energy blasts, and being struck by superhumanly strong foes without being injured.

Upon accepting his first offer to work for the Weapon X Program, North is artificially granted a slight healing factor that allows him to recover from mild to moderate injuries much faster than an average human. It also renders him immune to most diseases and toxins and greatly suppresses his natural aging process. However, after contracting the Legacy Virus, his kinetic absorption ability is dramatically reduced in efficiency and his healing factor burns itself out while fighting the virus.

After the virus claims his life and he is resuscitated by Elena Ivanova, the Legacy Virus immediately goes into remission and his kinetic absorption ability mutates. After absorbing energy, North must release the energy in the forms of powerful concussive, AoE (area of effect) or heat blasts. He can also channel the energy into his physical attacks, increasing impact force from his punches and kicks to superhuman levels.

After being forced to join the Weapon X Program once again, North's regenerative aspects were restored along with having his kinetic absorption ability artificially tempered. Now, aside from channeling the energy to increase the strength of his physical attacks and discharge ranged blasts of kinetic energy, North's fingertips carry a corrosive enzyme secreted through the skin that carried over into his force discharges. Aside from its acidic properties, the enzyme is specifically designed by the Weapon X Program to counteract the effects of an opponent's self-healing capabilities by reversing the process. The more an enemy's body attempts to fix and/or mend itself from injuries sustained, the worse injuries become thanks to the specialized enzyme. As a side effect of the procedure used to grant him this ability, Agent Zero's body now possesses no discernible scent to track.

Currently, North possesses no superhuman powers. Like most of the world's mutant population, North has lost his mutant powers following the events of M-Day.

Skills and equipment
North is a highly skilled hand-to-hand combatant and covert operative. He is also an expert marksman, skilled in the use of virtually all types of firearms. He has also worn a variety of uniforms over the course of his career.

The costume he has worn for most of his mercenary career as Maverick is a suit of body armor consisting of lightweight fiberglass armor plating, a padded kevlar lining, and airtight seals or shields that allow him to seal the suit for further protection. His mask contained a limited oxygen supply as well as infrared scanning and targeting systems. The suit also harnessed a booster pack that could magnify the kinetic energy his body absorbed. Canadian inventor Isabel Ferguson is the primary source of his specialized gear.

As Agent Zero, North wears a body armor woven from vibranium, rendering him completely silent as he moves. It also refracts light which renders him practically invisible to conventional detection methods in total darkness.

North has carried a wide array of weaponry including, but not limited to: thermite bombs, hydraulic bolt guns, titanium bullets, wrist-mounted projectile tasers, wrist-mounted plasma blasters, adamantium bullets, anti-metal bullets, and an adamantium-coated knife.

Reception
 In 2014, Entertainment Weekly ranked Maverick/Agent Zero 39th in their "Let's rank every X-Man ever" list.

Other versions

Exiles
An alternate version of Maverick was revealed to exist in Exiles #62. Maverick was forced to join Weapon X, a group of reality-hopping people who had to kill people to save realities. Little is known about Maverick, except that he apparently was killed by the bladed shield of an alternate version of Captain America. For a time, the body was trapped in the Timebroker's Crystal Palace until the Exiles sent his body back home. On his homeworld of Earth-1287, Maverick was revealed to be an agent of S.H.I.E.L.D. before his abduction, working alongside Nick Fury, who later honored his best agent by giving him a proper funeral.

Earth-5700
In a possible future timeline (Earth-5700), Agent Zero joined a Wolverine-led version of the X-Men, teaming with Archangel, Juggernaut, Sunfire, Mystique, Aurora, and Deadpool. After a time, the Director activated Zero's embedded mental directive, and Zero, against his will, slaughtered the X-Men, except for Wolverine. Unable to bring himself to kill his friend and teammate, he fought the mind control just long enough to commit suicide.

In other media

Television

 Christoph Nord / Maverick appears in X-Men: The Animated Series, voiced by an uncredited voice actor. This version is a former member of Weapon X who seeks to recover his lost memories.
 Christoph Nord / Maverick appears in Wolverine and the X-Men, voiced by Crispin Freeman. This version only possesses kinetic energy absorption and is the father of series original character Christie Nord. After being captured, brainwashed, and forced to work for Weapon X's Team X, Maverick is sent to capture Christie until Wolverine and Mystique join forces to stop him. Afterwards, Emma Frost restores Maverick's memories, allowing him to reunite with Christie.

Film

Agent Zero appears in X-Men Origins: Wolverine, portrayed by Daniel Henney. This version is a ruthless Asian mutant with superhuman reflexes, agility, and accuracy with firearms who serves as a member of Team X, and William Stryker's second-in-command. Additionally, producer Lauren Shuler Donner stated on the DVD commentary that Zero has no scent. After most of Team X question Stryker's morality and leave the group, Stryker, Zero, and Victor Creed set about killing them for Stryker's experiments. Zero targets Logan, killing an elderly couple who took in the latter along the way, before Logan destroys the helicopter Zero was pursuing him in, causing it to crash with Zero still inside.

Video games
Agent Zero appears in the X-Men Origins: Wolverine tie-in game, voiced by Robert Wu. This version's name is David Nord. His role plays out similarly to the film, though Logan stabs Zero with his claws following the helicopter crash.

References

External links
 David North at Marvel.com
 UncannyXmen.net Spotlight On Maverick

Characters created by Jim Lee
Comics characters introduced in 1992
Fictional assassins in comics
Marvel Comics characters with accelerated healing
Fictional characters with memory disorders
Fictional German people
Fictional gunfighters in comics
Fictional mercenaries in comics
Fictional murderers
Fictional secret agents and spies
Marvel Comics martial artists
Marvel Comics mutants
Marvel Comics superheroes
Marvel Comics supervillains
Superhero film characters
Wolverine (comics) characters
X-Men supporting characters